is a former Japanese football player.

Playing career
Kanemoto was born in Hiroshima Prefecture on July 13, 1977. After graduating from high school, he joined his local club, Sanfrecce Hiroshima, in 1996. He played as defensive midfielder in 1997; however, he did not play very often. In 1999, he moved to the newly promoted J2 League club, Oita Trinita. He played in many matches as a defensive midfielder. The club won the championship in 2002 and was promoted to the J1 League in 2003. However he played less and less often in 2003 and he retired at the end of the 2003 season.

Club statistics

References

External links

biglobe.ne.jp

1977 births
Living people
Association football people from Hiroshima Prefecture
Japanese footballers
J1 League players
J2 League players
Sanfrecce Hiroshima players
Oita Trinita players
Association football midfielders